Anopina manantlana is a species of moth of the family Tortricidae. It is found in Jalisco, Mexico.

References

Moths described in 2000
manantlana
Moths of Central America